was the eighth of ten s built for the Imperial Japanese Navy in the mid-1930s under the Circle Two Supplementary Naval Expansion Program (Maru Ni Keikaku).

History
The Asashio-class destroyers were larger and more capable that the preceding , as Japanese naval architects were no longer constrained by the provisions of the London Naval Treaty. These light cruiser-sized vessels were designed to take advantage of Japan's lead in torpedo technology, and to accompany the Japanese main striking force and in both day and night attacks against the United States Navy as it advanced across the Pacific Ocean, according to Japanese naval strategic projections. Despite being one of the most powerful classes of destroyers in the world at the time of their completion, none survived the Pacific War.

Minegumo, built at the Fujinagata Shipyards in Osaka was laid down on 22 March 1937, launched on 4 November 1937 and commissioned on 4 April 1938.

Operational history

At the time of the attack on Pearl Harbor, Minegumo, under the command of Lieutenant Commander Suzuki Yasuatsu, was assigned to Destroyer Division 8 (Desdiv 8), and a member of Destroyer Squadron 4 (Desron 4) of the IJN 2nd Fleet, escorting Admiral Nobutake Kondō's Southern Force Main Body out of Mako Guard District as distant cover to the Malaya and Philippines invasion forces in December 1941.

In early 1942, she escorted troop convoys to Lingayen, Tarakan, Balikpapan and Makassar in the Netherlands East Indies. During the Battle of the Java Sea, she engaged in an exchange of gunnery with the British destroyer , and suffered light damage with four crewmen wounded. After participation in the Battle of Christmas Island on 31 March – 10 April, she escorted the damaged cruiser  to Singapore, and returned at the end of the month to the Yokosuka Naval Arsenal for repairs.

At the end of May, Minegumo joined the escort for the Midway Invasion Force under the overall command of Admiral Kondo Nobutake during the Battle of Midway. In July, she was sent to northern waters, patrolling from Ominato Guard District towards the Kurile Islands. Afterwards, she was sent south to Truk, where she suffered minor damage on a coral reef on 20 August. She provided support in the Battle of the Eastern Solomons in August 1942, and escorted the damaged aircraft carrier  back to Truk. From September, she was assigned to patrols from Truk towards Shortland, and in October was assigned to "Tokyo Express" high speed transport operations in the Solomon Islands. She limped back to Yokosuka for repairs by the end of November.

Repairs completed by 22 February 1943, Minegumo returned with a convoy to Truk. She continued on to Rabaul by 2 March. However, that same night, Murasame and Minegumo were detected by the American Task Force 68 off Vila, after delivering supplies to the Japanese base there. On Minegumo, 46 crewmen (including her captain, Lieutenant Commander Yoshitake Uesugi) perished, but 122 survivors later reached Japanese lines, and two were captured by the Americans. Minegumo was removed from the navy list on 1 April 1943.

See also 
 The Battle of Blackett Strait

Notes

References

External links
CombinedFleet.com: Asashio-class destroyers
CombinedFleet.com: Minegumo history
GlobalSecurity.org: Asashio class destroyers
Naval Historical Center entry on the Minegumo

Asashio-class destroyers
World War II destroyers of Japan
Shipwrecks in the Solomon Sea
1937 ships
Maritime incidents in June 1941
Maritime incidents in March 1943
Ships built by Fujinagata Shipyards